The India Mobile Congress (IMC) is the largest digital technologies' forum in Asia, consisting of a three-day international conference and a technology exhibition. The event is envisioned to be the "leading platform for India's start-up and technology ecosystem." Within the telecommunications and technology industry, IMC is already known as the "largest digital technology forum in Asia." The mega-event is organised jointly by the Cellular Operators Association of India (COAI) and the Department of Telecommunications (DoT), Government of India.
The forum aims to be a platform for industry, businesses, regulators and policymakers to discuss and deliberate on critical issues affecting the growth and proliferation of the telecom and technology sector. In the first two editions, IMC was focused on the transformative technology of 5G and most of the booths showcased various use-cases and scenarios where 5G would play an important role; the exhibitors included service providers, OEMs and infrastructure providers.

India Mobile Congress(IMC) 2022 is scheduled from 01-04 October, 2022 at Pragati Maidan, New Delhi.

Organizers 
India Mobile Congress is jointly organized by the Department of Telecommunications, Government of India and the Cellular Operators Association of India.

Department of Telecommunications 
Department of Telecommunications is a department of the Ministry of Communications, Government of India. The department was formed to ensure reliable, affordable and high-quality telecommunications services in the country that could facilitate accelerated and inclusive socio-economic development.

Cellular Operators Association of India 
Cellular Operators Association of India is a registered, non-governmental society, constituted in 1995 for the advancement of modern communication and successful proliferation of mobile networks throughout India. COAI is now the official voice of the India telecom industry and aims to present an industry consensus to the Government on crucial issues related to the Indian telecom industry.

Past Events 
So far, five editions of India Mobile Congress have taken place. Starting in 2017, IMC is held annually and has taken place in the month of September in 2017 and October in 2018. India Mobile Congress 2019 was held from 14 October 2019 to 16 October 2019, IMC 2020 & IMC 2021 were held virtually on 08-09-10 Dec 2020 and 2021 respectively.

India Mobile Congress 2017 
India Mobile Congress 2017 was held from 27 September 2017 to 29 September 2017 at Pragati Maidan, New Delhi. This was the first edition of the globally recognized event and saw the participation of 2000 delegates, 32000 visitors, 152 speakers, 100 start-ups and 100 exhibitors. IMC 2017 was inaugurated by Minister of State (Independent Charge) for Communications, Manoj Sinha. Some of the notable speakers at the event were:

 Ravi Shankar Prasad, Minister of Electronics and Information Technology
 Dharmendra Pradhan, Minister for Skill Development and Entrepreneurship
 Vittorio Colao, CEO of Vodafone Group
 Mukesh Ambani, Chairman, Reliance Industries
 Sunil Bharti Mittal, Chairman, Bharti Enterprises
 Rajan Anandan, Google Vice President for South East Asia and India

India Mobile Congress 2017 was dubbed "the country's first and biggest ever, platform to bring together all stakeholders from Telecom, Internet & Mobility ecosystem along with Information and Communication Technology players, app developers, innovators and start-ups." Exhibitors included Telecom Service Providers (TSPs), handset manufacturers, Internet giants, ISPs, Global technology players, AI & VR companies, Mobility leaders, Academia, Start-ups and app providers.

India Mobile Congress 2018 

India Mobile Congress 2018 was held on 25 October 2018 through 27 October 2018 at Aerocity, New Delhi. The event was kick-started with a grand inauguration ceremony, led by  Minister of State (Independent Charge) for Communications, Manoj Sinha. The keynote address was delivered by Youngky Kim, President and Head of Networks Business at Samsung Electronics. The theme for the 2018 edition was "New Digital Horizons Connect, Create, Innovate".

The event venue was spread over 50,000 square meters of space and participants included:

 50,000+ visitors
 20 countries
 5000+ international delegates
 300 companies showcasing their latest products and innovations
 10 supporting ministries

India Mobile Congress 2019 

India Mobile Congress 2019 was held on 14 October 2019 to 16 October 2019 at Aerocity, New Delhi.India Mobile Congress (IMC) 2019 was the third edition of India's marquee telecom and technology event that has quickly become one of the most important platforms for policy discussions, industry debates, collaborations, networking and highlighting industry trends. Jointly organised by the Department of Telecommunications & COAI, with support from Ministry of Electronics and Information Technology (MeitY), the theme for IMC 2019 was Imagine: a new CONNECTED world; Intelligent. Immersive. Inventive.” The event was inaugurated by Sh. Ravi Shankar Prasad and attended by the who's who of the telecom and allied sectors. IMC 2019 saw the participation of more than 50 countries, telecom giants, OEMs, system integrators, technology experts, industry analysts, government officials, young professionals, startups and students.

Technology & Innovation
The focus area for IMC 2019 was 5G with more than 50 5G demos (use cases) showcased over three days. A number of companies including Ericsson, Huawei, Airtel, Vodafone Idea, Jio, Nokia, Qualcomm and ZTE, showcased unique 5G use cases. It's demos and showcases like this that make India Mobile Congress a resounding success and ensure that it stands heads and shoulders above other tech and telecom events in Asia.
Apart from 5G, other focus areas were smart cities, internet of things (IoT), logistics, Dubbed the biggest digital technology platform in Asia, IMC 2019 certainly lived up to the hype by putting up a grand show with 60,000 square metres of total event area. This year, there was a footfall of 75,278 over three days and social media was abuzz with the news of IMC with over 1.4 billion impressions recorded across various social media platforms.

Startups
More than 250 startups were a part of IMC 2019. Startups are an integral part of India Mobile Congress and each year, we aim to push an increasing number of startups to the forefront by giving them an opportunity to showcase their products, collaborate with other companies, network with industry decision makers and leave a lasting impression. To celebrate the spirit of innovation and help the startups of today to become the unicorns of tomorrow, IMC in collaboration with AGNIi, Invest India, Startup India and Nalco, organised a Grand Innovation Challenge to recognise the best innovations by Indian startups. There were some  notable speakers at the event like:

 Ravi Shankar Prasad, Minister of Electronics and Information Technology. Law & Justice, Government of India .
 Kumar Mangalam Birla, Chairman of the  Aditya Birla Group
 Malcolm Johnson,  Deputy Secretary-General ITU
 Jim Whitehurst, President and CEO  Red Hat
 Nunzio Mirtillo , Sr. Vice President & Head of Market Area South East Asia, Oceania & India  Ericsson
 Arun Kumar, Chairman and CEO, KPMG India

India Mobile Congress 2020

IMC 2020 was a virtual event, which had around 27,213 attendees, national and international delegates, over 170 partners & exhibitors and start-ups, and more than 196 thought leaders including the opening address by Hon’ble Prime Minister of India Shri Narendra Modi. This event had more than 1.16 billion Digital media impressions, and 1.9 Mn video downloads, spanning three days.

India Mobile Congress 2021

IMC 2021 was a virtual event, which had around 23,118 attendees, national and international delegates, over 218 partners & exhibitors and start-ups, and more than 226 thought leaders. This event had more than 1.06 billion Digital media impressions, and 1.42 Mn video downloads, spanning three days

See also 

 Cellular Operators Association of India (COAI)
 Department of Telecommunications

References 

Digital technology
Smartphones
Telecommunication conferences